was a radio program broadcast by Nippon Cultural Broadcasting between October 13, 2002 and June 27, 2004, and was produced by MediaWorks for Dengeki G's Magazine, a bishōjo game magazine MediaWorks publishes. There were ninety regular broadcasts airing once a week every Sunday between 11:00 PM and 11:30 PM. A single sixty-minute special was broadcast on December 2, 2006 called Dengeki G's Radio 2006.

History
The program began as a tie-up with a radio program which had been previously broadcast for Sister Princess called Sister Princess: Onii-chan to Issho, and the same personalities for that program, Natsuko Kuwatani and Hisayo Mochizuki, were used starting with the fifteenth broadcast on January 19, 2003. Two others who were cast in the Sister Princess anime series, Yumiko Kobayashi and Nana Mizuki of the unit Prits, also made regular appearances on the program. An audition was held for to create a protegee group for Prits known as Puppy's which consisted of Yasuko Itō, Shizuka Hasegawa and Ai Matayoshi; the members in Puppy's were also regular members to Dengeki G's Radio.

Going off of Sister Princess''' success, the editors for Dengeki G's Magazine decided to start a listener-participation game written by the same author of Sister Princess: Sakurako Kimino. This new game was called Puppy Girls: Watashi no Ojisama, though it was decided to cancel the game and Dengeki G's Radio itself mid-way to make way for a radio drama for Dengeki G's Magazine's main reader-participation game at the time: Futakoi.

Puppy Girls: Watashi no Ojisama
 was an original listener-participation game on Dengeki G's Radio, written by Sakurako Kimino. The concept was that the listeners of the program would be able to send in postcards of what they would like to hear in a radio drama for the characters in the series. The game started with the eighteenth broadcast on February 9, 2003, and ended with the forty-seventh broadcast on August 31, 2003, though was cancelled pre-maturely. A segment of the game ran in Dengeki G's Magazine'' between the March and October 2003 issues, with accompanied illustrations by Pururu Kinkakuji.

Premise
The story of a group of five orphaned sisters.

Characters

References

External links
Dengeki G's Radio official website 
Dengeki G's Radio complete transcripts 

 
Japanese radio dramas
2002 radio programme debuts
2004 radio programme endings